Durgapur College of Commerce and Science, established in 2003, is a college in Durgapur, in Paschim Bardhaman district. It offers undergraduate, postgraduate courses in science and Commerce. It is affiliated to  Kazi Nazrul University, Asansol.

Departments

Science

Biochemistry (B.Sc & M.Sc)
Microbiology
Biotechnology
Environmental Science

References

Universities and colleges in Paschim Bardhaman district
Colleges affiliated to Kazi Nazrul University
Educational institutions established in 2003
2003 establishments in West Bengal